Stephen Ip Shue-kwan, GBS, JP (born 1951) is a former politician in Hong Kong, he was Secretary for Economic Development and Labour for the Hong Kong Special Administrative Region from 2002 to 2007.

The post of Secretary for Economic Development and Labour is a political appointment. Ip was Secretary for Economic Services in June 1996 under Chris Patten's colonial administration, until he took up his last civil service post of Secretary for Financial Services in June 2000. In 2005, he proposed a 25–50% decrease in port fees to increase Hong Kong's competitiveness in the Pearl River Delta Economic Zone.

After his retirement, he became a food critic. He is currently writing columns for Headline Daily.

References

1955 births
Living people
Alumni of St. Paul's College, Hong Kong
Alumni of the University of Hong Kong
Government officials of Hong Kong
Members of the Executive Council of Hong Kong
Hong Kong food writers
Recipients of the Gold Bauhinia Star